Borthakur or Barthakur is an Indian surname originating from the state of Assam. It refers to the royal Assamese Brahmin priest family. The Borthakur family can be found in Sivasagar, Jorhat, Golaghat, Kamrup and  Dibrugarh Districts of Assam. They originated from the holy land of Kashi. 

Notable people of this surname include:

Dipali Borthakur (born 1941), Indian singer
Inderjit Kaur Barthakur, Indian civil servant, economist and writer

Parineeta Borthakur, Indian actress and singer
Plabita Borthakur, Indian actress and singer
Promod Borthakur, Indian politician
Ranjit Barthakur, Indian businessman, Executive Chairman of  Royal Multisport Pvt. Ltd., the company that owns the Indian Premier League team, Rajasthan Royals. 
Sheela Borthakur, Indian social worker
Zubeen Borthakur (later known as Zubeen Garg), Indian singer, songwriter, actor

Assamese-language surnames